Jaan Ki Kasam is a 1991 Indian Bollywood drama film directed by Sushil Malik and produced by Javed Riaz. It stars Suresh Oberoi, Raza Murad and Archana Puran Singh in pivotal roles. This film took inspiration from The Blue Lagoon.

Plot
The movie is about how a family traveling by air meet with an accident. Tanvee is the only one who survives and starts to live on an isolated island where she meets Rajan. The story is about their love and survival as they grow up.

Cast
 Suresh Oberoi as Kumar
 Archana Puran Singh as Kumar's Wife
 Raza Murad as Paras Seth
 Ranjeet as Jagdish
 Pramod Moutho as Bajrangi
 Avtar Gill as Sher Khan
 Vikas Anand as Bholu Kaka
 Krishna as Rajan
 Saathi Ganguly as Tanvi

Soundtrack

The soundtrack of Jaan Ki Kasam was composed by the music duo Nadeem Shravan. The lyrics were written by Sameer.

References

External links

1990s Hindi-language films
1991 films
Films scored by Nadeem–Shravan
Indian adventure drama films
Indian remakes of American films